The desert healer is a mixed drink made with fresh orange juice, gin, cherry brandy and ginger beer. The recipe appears in The Savoy Cocktail Book. The Art of Mixing (1932) recipe replaces the ginger beer with ginger ale. The cocktail's history goes back to the 1930s Vendome Club in Hollywood, when Los Angeles was still mostly undeveloped desert.

First the gin, brandy and orange juice are shaken with ice and strained into a highball over ice. Then the ginger ale is added, slowly, and stirred in. It's garnished with an orange wedge or orange peel, and cherry, and served in a highball glass.

References

Cocktails with orange juice
Cocktails with fruit liqueur
Cocktails with gin
Cocktails with ginger ale
Cocktails with ginger beer
Bubbly cocktails